Francisco Xavier López Mena (born 15 August 1953) is a Mexican politician affiliated with the National Action Party. As of 2014 he served as Deputy of the LIX Legislature of the Mexican Congress as a plurinominal representative.

References

1953 births
Living people
Politicians from Quintana Roo
Members of the Chamber of Deputies (Mexico)
National Action Party (Mexico) politicians
Universidad Iberoamericana alumni
21st-century Mexican politicians
Deputies of the LIX Legislature of Mexico